Rafael Nadal defeated David Ferrer in the final, 6–2, 6–4, to win his record-extending sixth title at the Barcelona Open.

Fernando Verdasco was the defending champion but chose not to compete this year.

Seeds
The top eight seeds received a bye into the second round.

Qualifying

Draw

Finals

Top half

Section 1

Section 2

Bottom half

Section 3

Section 4

References
Main Draw

Singles